Alicia Molik and Francesca Schiavone were the defending champions, but Molik did not compete this year. Schiavone teamed up with Květa Peschke and lost in the quarterfinals to Elena Likhovtseva and Vera Zvonareva.

Daniela Hantuchová and Ai Sugiyama won the title by defeating Li Ting and Sun Tiantian 6–4, 6–4 in the final.

Seeds

Draw

Draw

Qualifying
Displayed below is the qualifying draw of the 2006 Qatar Ladies Open Doubles.

Seeds

Qualifiers
  Angelika Bachmann /  Kira Nagy

Qualifying draw

References
 ITF Tournament profile
 Main and Qualifying Draws (WTA)

Qatar Ladies Open
Qatar Ladies Open
2006 in Qatari sport